The 2013 Omloop Het Nieuwsblad took place on 23 February 2013. It was the 68th edition of the international classic Omloop Het Nieuwsblad.

's Luca Paolini of Italy beat 's Stijn Vandenbergh of Belgium in a two-up sprint.

Teams 

Non ProTeams teams are indicated by an asterisk below. Each of the 25 teams were permitted up to eight riders, for a total of 198 riders.

*

*
*
*
*

*

*

*
*

*

*

*

Results

References 

2013
Omloop Het Nieuwsblad
Omloop
Omloop Het Nieuwsblad